Caleuche Chasma is a Y-shaped chasma on Pluto's moon, Charon. The feature was discovered using stereoscopic processing of New Horizons images.

Naming
Caleuche Chasma got its official name from the IAU along with eleven other surface features of Charon on 11 April 2018 in response to a proposal by NASA's New Horizons team. It is named for the mythical Chilean ghost ship Caleuche. The designation was a part of the Our Pluto initiative by New Horizons, which invited the general public to suggest and vote for names for surface features in the Pluto system. Caleuche was included in the voting on 21 March 2015. It did not make to the initial proposal, sent to the IAU by the New Horizons team on 7 July 2015 but was included later.

In popular culture
In 2019, composer and Royal Academy of Music professor David Gorton wrote a composition for two cellos titled Caleuche Chasma

See also
 List of geological features on Charon

References

Canyons and gorges
Depressions (geology)
New Horizons
Surface features of Charon